MACHO-98-BLG-35 was a gravitational microlensing event that occurred in July 1998 in the constellation Sagittarius. The red dwarf star causing the lens may have a planet, according to one study.

Planet

References 

Sagittarius (constellation)
M-type main-sequence stars
19980625